P-51 Dragon Fighter is a 2014 science fiction fantasy action film written and directed by Mark Atkins. The film stars Scott Martin, Stephanie Beran, Ross Brooks, Thom Rachford, Clint Glenn Hummel, Harwood Gordon, Stephen Suitts, Trey McCurley, Riley Litman, Anthony Dupray, Johnny Kostrey, Paul Whetstone, Michael Hampton, Stephen Blackehart and Pernille Trojgaard.

Plot
Some time before World War II, a Nazi archaeological expedition had found a dragon's egg and hatched it, setting about to breed more. These dragons are able to reproduce parthenogenically, with one dragon able to reproduce many times, as can each of her "daughters". The dragons themselves are controlled by Vril, Aryan witch women who are psychically connected to the dragons and can command them.

In 1942, Dr. Heinrich Gudrun (Ozman Sirgood), a Nazi cryptozoologist in charge of the dragon breeding program, code named "Skyward", arrives with his brood. The adult dragons and the vrill are intended to regain air superiority in the North African Campaign to support the Afrika Korps, under the command of Field Marshal Erwin Rommel (Robert Pike Daniel).

To combat the dragons, an American general is dispatched with orders to put together a squadron made up of the best Allied fighter pilots that are available, led by Lieutenant John Robbins (Scott Martin), the only survivor of the first fighter squadron to encounter the dragons. General Ward (Thom Rachford) forms the "Ghost Squadron", so named because it does not officially exist. 

In their North American P-51 Mustangs, the squadron leads the dragons into a trap made up of numerous flak guns. The guns shoot down two while one of the pilots manages to shoot down a dragon and mark the location before he runs out of fuel and is himself killed by the dragons. Lt. Robbins departs with his friends to go to the shoot-down site to see what they can learn, but are captured by German soldiers, who take them to see Field Marshal Rommel.

Rommel, who has serious doubts about Dr. Gudrun's intentions and the vrill's ability to keep the dragons under control, meets with Robbins. He reveals that, that once in a very long while, the parthenogenic females will lay an egg that hatches out a male dragon, and that the incredibly rare males are so powerful that the legends say they herald the end of the world.  Rommel explains this actually means the fall of a civilization, saying that one male dragon had laid waste to the Carthaginian Empire, and another had accelerated the fall of the Roman Empire. He also believes Dr. Gudrun has possession of such an egg in his incubator complex, hidden under a mountain.

Rommel gives Robbins the location of the incubator and explains that he will have an "inside man" open an air vent that lead directly into the incubator. All the Allied pilots have to do is put a bomb down the vent, and the incubator and the eggs will be destroyed. Armed with this information, an air attack with an accompanying British SAS ground mission is planned. General Anderson (Harwood Gordon) obtains a B-17 Flying Fortress bomber from an antisubmarine squadron to handle the problem of a down-the-stack shot.

The Ghost Squadron, escorting the Fortress, keep the Nazi dragons at bay long enough for it to bomb the incubator and destroy the eggs. Rommel's "inside man" — one of the vrill women Dagmar (Pernille Trojgaard), a British agent — opens the facility's air vent for Ghost Squadron. Gundrun releases Asuzaka, a gigantic male dragon, but is incinerated by him. During the aerial battle, only Lt. Marks (Stephen Suitts) is unscathed as each pilot rams a dragon to halt the attacking force of dragons, buying time for the Fortress to reach the mountain and destroy the facility, taking with it Asuzaka and the remaining dragons. When it is thought that Lt. Robbins is also killed, a SAS ground party, however, locates him and bring him back to the headquarters hospital where he reunites with nurse Rachel McKee (Stephanie Beran).

With all the dragon eggs destroyed and the adult dragons killed, the war will proceed with conventional weaponry.

Cast
 Scott Martin as Lieutenant John Robbins
 Stephanie Beran as Rachel McKee
 Ross Brooks as Lieutenant Drake Holdrin
 Thom Rachford as General Ward 
 Clint Glenn Hummel as Lieutenant Jake Kranston 
 Harwood Gordon as General Anderson 
 Stephen Suitts as Lieutenant Arthur Marks
 Trey McCurley as Lieutenant Jeff Campbell
 Riley Litman as 2nd Lieutenant Robert Foy 
 Anthony Dupray as Lieutenant Bertrand Galieu
 Johnny Kostrey as Flight Lieutenant Karl Kuttelwascher 
 Paul Whetstone as General Dirk Emerick
 Michael Hampton as Pilot Officer Alistair Godfrey
 Stephen Blackehart as Flight Lieutenant Millet 
 Pernille Trojgaard as Dagmar (vril)
 Ozman Sirgood as Dr. Heinrich Gudrun 
 Robert Pike Daniel as General Erwin Rommel (spelled as "Irwin" Rommel)
 Madison Boyd as Sue Strickland
 Jared Cohn as Lieutenant Gilman

Production
P-51 Dragon Fighter relied heavily on computer-generated imagery to recreate the aerial battles of P-51 Fighter aircraft and dragons. The principal photography in a North Africa landscape was based on location shooting at Blue Cloud Movie Ranch, Santa Clarita, Red Rock Canyon State Park, Cantil, and Trona Pinnacles, Ridgecrest, California.

Reception
In his review of P-51 Dragon Fighter, film critic Martin Hafer notes: "The bottom line is that P-51 is indeed a bad movie—and this should come as no surprise to anyone (except, perhaps, the folks who made the film). It does have some decent production values and might be of interest to the really undemanding and possibly demented film buff. My only worry is that if the film manages to somehow make money that we'll see even weirder mash-ups. What's next—'Cavemen with Nukes', 'Jesus and Gandhi Versus Hitler' or perhaps 'The Obaminator'–where we learn that our president is a robot sent from the future to wipe out mankind?!"

References

Notes

Citations

Bibliography

 Gerard, Philip. Secret Soldiers: The Story of World War II's Heroic Army of Deception. New York: Dutton, 2002. .

External links
 
 
 ITunes Review of P-51 Dragon Fighter

2014 films
Alternate Nazi Germany films
Films about dragons
Films directed by Mark Atkins
North African campaign films
World War II aviation films
American alternate history films
Cultural depictions of Erwin Rommel
American fantasy action films
American monster movies
American action war films
Horror war films
Supernatural war films
American exploitation films
2010s English-language films
2010s American films